Neoprotoparmelia amerisidiata is a species of corticolous (bark dwelling) and crustose lichen in the family Parmeliaceae. Found in the southeastern United States, it was formally described as a new species in 2018 by Garima Singh and André Aptroot. The type specimen was collected by James Lendemer in the Sapelo Island Wildlife Management Area (Sapelo Island, Georgia); here the lichen was found growing on oak bark. It has a thin, shiny, pale olive-green to olive-grey thallus with numerous isidia. Secondary chemicals in the lichen that are detectable with thin-layer chromatography include alectoronic acid (major), and lesser to trace amounts of dehydroalectoronic acid and β-alectoronic acid. The specific epithet amerisidiata refers to both its North American distribution and the presence of isidia. It is known from North Carolina, Alabama, Georgia, Mississippi, and Florida.

References

amerisidiata
Lichen species
Lichens described in 2018
Lichens of the Southeastern United States
Taxa named by André Aptroot
Fungi without expected TNC conservation status